Pablo Morales (born 1964) is an American former competition swimmer. 

Pablo Morales is also the name of:
Pablo Morales Pérez (1905–1969), Venezuelan baseball executive and promoter
Pablo Morales Rivera, Costa Rican politician 
Pablo Escudero Morales (born 1973), Mexican PVEM politician
Pablo Reimers Morales, Mexican businessman

See also
Morales